Alfred Modesto Lefevre (September 16, 1898 – January 21, 1982) was an infielder in Major League Baseball. He played for the New York Giants.

References

External links

1898 births
1982 deaths
Major League Baseball infielders
New York Giants (NL) players
Baseball players from New York City
Burials at Calvary Cemetery (Queens)